Tsirkhe (Aghul: Зирхе, Цӏерхьеъ, Цӏирхье) is a rural locality (a selo) in Amukhsky Selsoviet, Agulsky District, Republic of Dagestan, Russia. The population was 10 as of 2010.

Geography 
Tsirkhe is located on the Tsirkharukh River, 26 km north of Tpig (the district's administrative centre) by road. Amukh is the nearest rural locality.

References 

Rural localities in Agulsky District